The 1993 Baltimore Orioles season was the 93rd baseball season in Orioles history. It involved the Orioles finishing tied with the Detroit Tigers for 3rd place in the American League East with a record of 85-77. They also hosted the 1993 Major League Baseball All-Star Game.

Offseason
 December 7, 1992: Sherman Obando was drafted by the Orioles from the New York Yankees in the 1992 rule 5 draft.
 December 11, 1992: Billy Ripken was released by the Orioles.
 December 14, 1992: Scott Coolbaugh was signed as a free agent by the Orioles.

Regular season
The Orioles hosted the 1993 Major League Baseball All-Star Game. It was the 64th playing of the midsummer classic between the all-stars of the American League (AL) and National League (NL) at Oriole Park at Camden Yards. The game resulted in the American League defeating the National League 9–3. Orioles pitcher Mike Mussina was voted onto the All-Star team, but did not pitch in the game due to his injury.

There was a controversial incident towards the end of the game when Mussina chose to warm-up in the bullpen, despite the fact AL manager Cito Gaston had told him prior to the game that he would not pitch during the contest because of his injury issues and in case the game went into extra innings. Orioles fans believed Mussina was warming up in preparation to come in and pitch the ninth inning and when Gaston put Duane Ward in to pitch the ninth inning, the fans at Camden Yards spent the rest of the game booing Gaston very loudly and many chanted the popular slogan saying "Cito Sucks" which could be heard years later in Baltimore anytime Baltimore played Toronto. Gaston was never treated well by Baltimore fans for the rest of his managerial career and he was subject to death threats for not pitching Mussina in the game. Many believe Mussina threw on his own as a way of publicly showing up Gaston because he was angry at not pitching in the game.

Season standings

Record vs. opponents

Notable transactions
 June 29, 1993: Mike Bielecki was signed as a free agent by the Orioles.
 August 15, 1993: Mike Bielecki was released by the Orioles.
 September 30, 1993: Scott Coolbaugh was released by the Orioles.

Roster

Player stats

Batting

Starters by position 
Note: Pos = Position; G = Games played; AB = At bats; R = Runs scored; H = Hits; 2B = Doubles; 3B = Triples; HR = Home runs; RBI = Runs batted in; AVG = Batting average; SB = Stolen bases

Other batters 
Note: G = Games played; AB = At bats; R = Runs scored; H = Hits; 2B = Doubles; 3B = Triples; HR = Home runs; RBI = Runs batted in; AVG = Batting average; SB = Stolen bases

Pitching

Starting pitchers 
Note: W = Wins; L = Losses; ERA = Earned run average; G = Games pitched; GS = Games started; IP = Innings pitched; R = Runs allowed; ER = Earned runs allowed; BB = Walks allowed; K = Strikeouts

Relief pitchers 
Note: W = Wins; L = Losses; ERA = Earned run average; G = Games pitched; SV = Saves; IP = Innings pitched; R = Runs allowed; ER = Earned runs allowed; BB = Walks allowed; K = Strikeouts

Farm system

Notes

References
1993 Baltimore Orioles team at Baseball-Reference
1993 Baltimore Orioles season at baseball-almanac.com

Baltimore Orioles seasons
Baltimore Orioles season
Baltimore